= Denman Estate Park =

Park in San Antonio, Texas, United States

Coordinates: 29.510°N 98.560°W

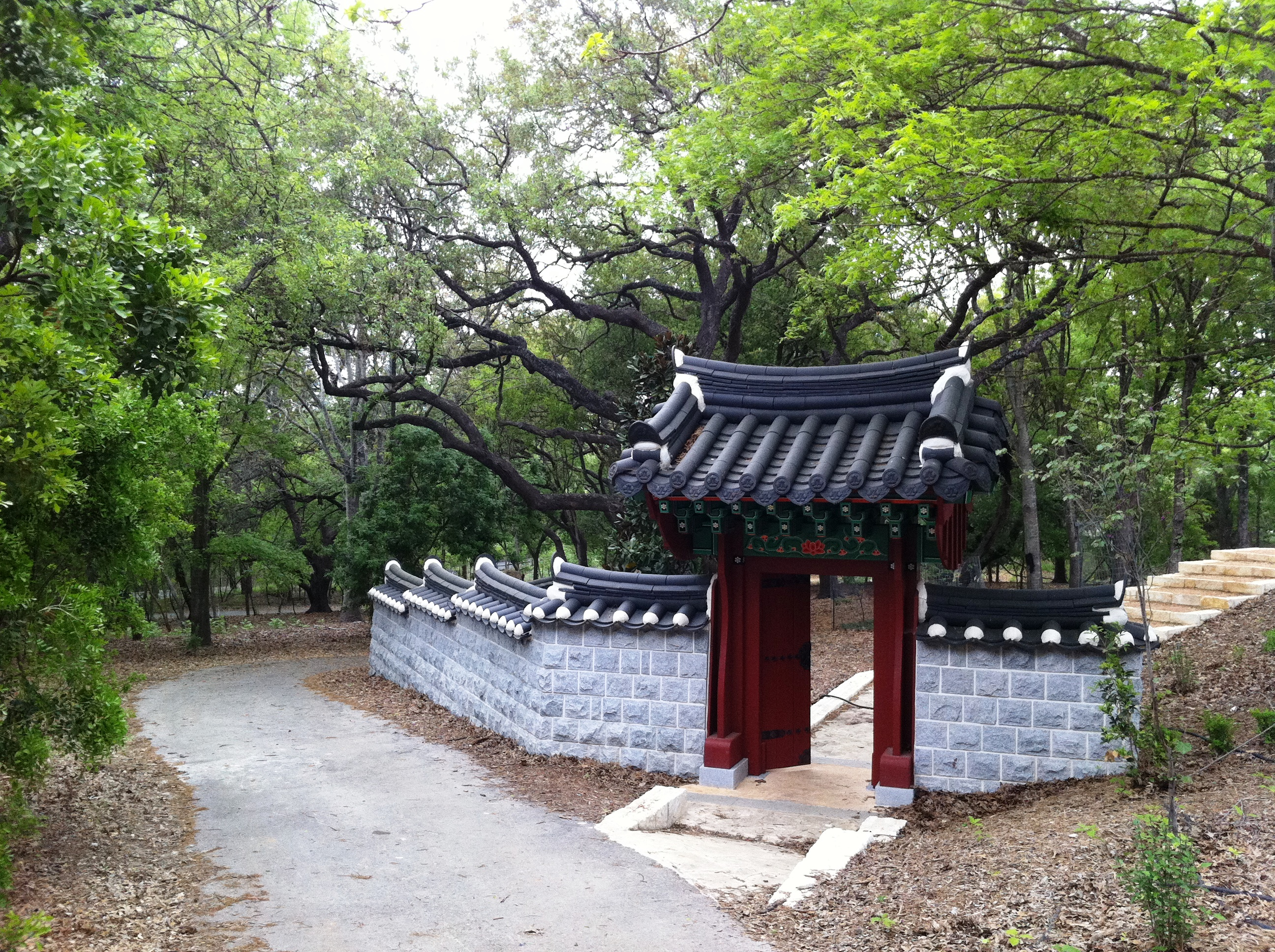

Denman Estate Park is the name of a city park located in northwest San Antonio, Texas, USA.

== Overview ==
The 21 acre public park was purchased by the City of San Antonio, and was part of the estate of attorney Gilbert J. Denman Jr., grandson of Leroy G. Denman, lawyer and jurist of the Texas Supreme Court.

Notably, the park contains a "gift from South Korea to the people of San Antonio", in the form of a Korean pavilion similar in design to the Gwangju Democracy Bell, in Gwangju South Korea. The pavilion (which reflects the traditional Korean methods of construction) was designed to "facilitate business and cultural friendships" between the two cities of Gwangju, South Korea and San Antonio, TX, USA. The two cities are sister cities. Architects were Yu Chang Byung and Hong Hee Lee, and the Korean firm Namkwang Construction Co., have been involved with the $1.2 million project, since its inception. The City of Kwangju provided half of those funds, while Namkwang Construction Co. also contributed to the project.

== Photogallery ==
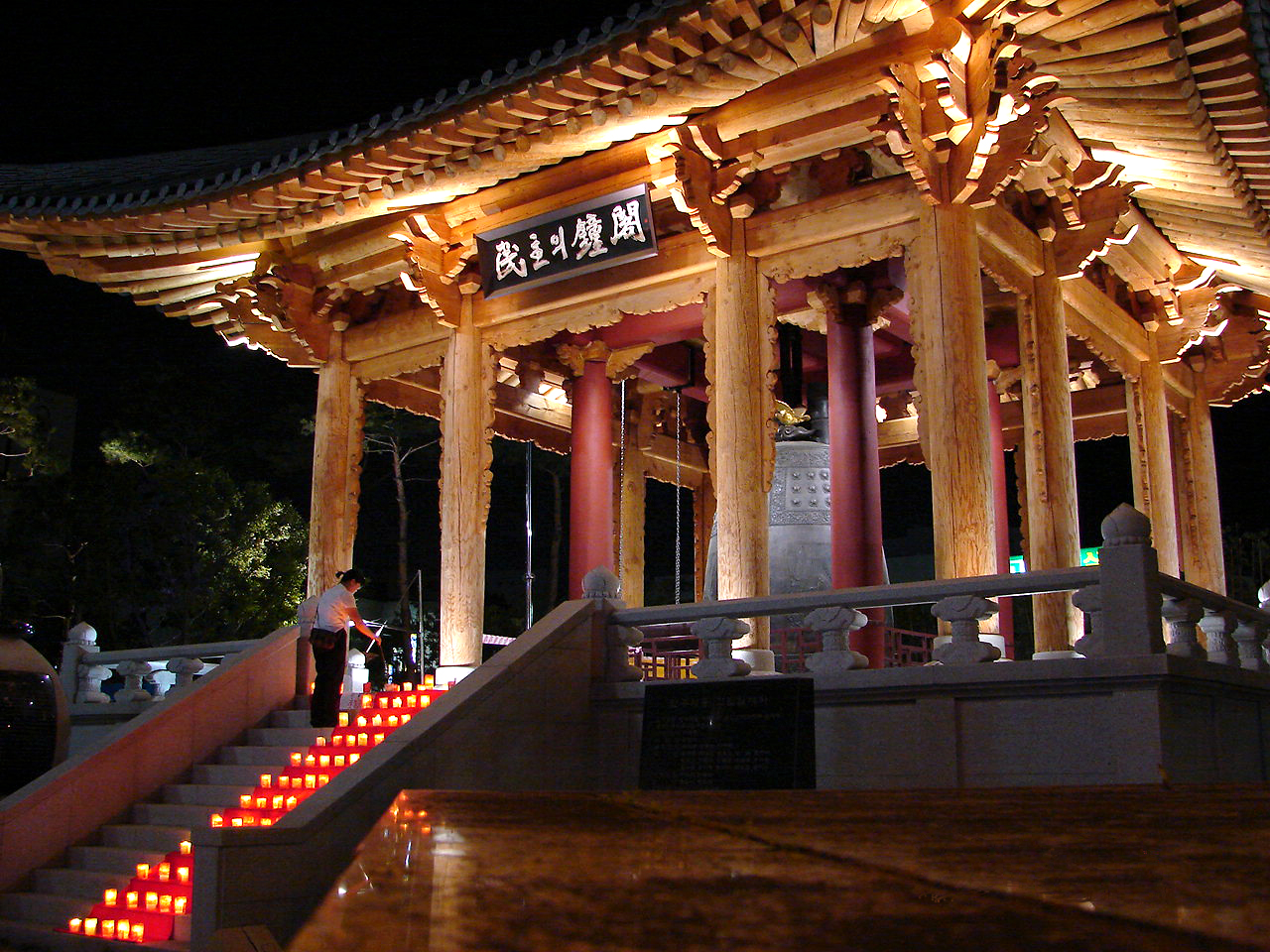
Democracy Bell, Gwangju, South Korea

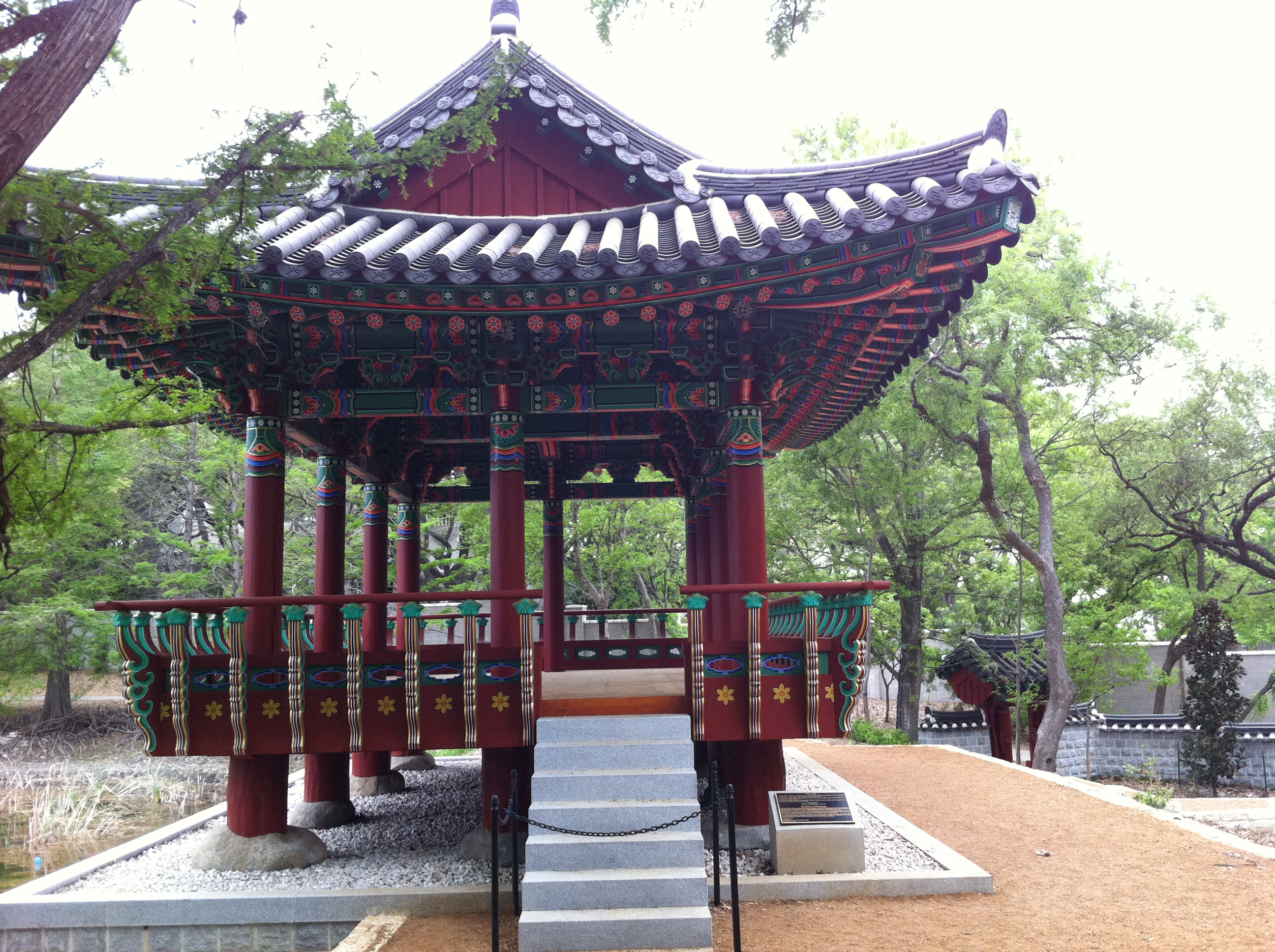
Gwangju Pavilion, San Antonio, Texas
